is a 12-episode anime created by RAMS and Fanworks. Directed by Aruzi Morino, it was broadcast in Japan on Kids Station between August 7, 2006, and October 23, 2006. It is the first non-comedy focused anime television series entirely created with Adobe Flash animation. 

The opening theme of the anime is "Dual Love on the planet ~Hanoka~" by Sakura Nogawa.

On October 4, 2006, Lantis released a maxi single for the anime's opening theme, "Dual Love on the planet ~Hanoka~". It was sung by Sakura Nogawa. The song was composed by Hironobu Kageyama.

On September and October 2008, 2 DVD volumes were released in Japan. This release is notable for including a Director's cut which includes new scenes, replaced dialogue and inclusion of prologue and epilogue.

Story
On planet Tokinea, a huge war between the humans and the indigenous alien species, The Star Inhabitant (星の民）, was ongoing. Humans were overpowered by The Star Inhabitants' power to control nature and came to the conclusion to produce a bionic human weapon named the Majin (lit. Demon God, Bionic Demigod). The 7th Majin, Majin No. 7, was also ordered to roll out to the battlefield. In the battlefield, she meets a male child soldier, Yuuri, and teams up with him.

Characters

Episode listing

References

External links
 Official RAMS Hanoka website 
 

Anime series
Science fiction anime and manga
Anime with original screenplays